Wonder Dog may refer to:

 Wonder Dog, the pet of Wendy and Marvin, two teenage characters of Super Friends
 Wonder Dog, musician Harry Thumann's side project, best known for the 1982 single "Ruff Mix"
 Wonder Dog (video game), a 1992 Mega CD video game by Core Design, ported in 1993 to the Amiga
 Wonder Dog (Disney short), a 1950 short animation by the Walt Disney Company
 Rex the Wonder Dog, a fictional dog in the DC Comics universe